Kuummiit (Kalaallisut: Kuummiut) is a settlement in the Sermersooq municipality in southeastern Greenland. Founded in 1915, it had 248 inhabitants in 2020.

Geography 

Population 
The population of Kuummiit has decreased by more than 27% relative to its 1990 level and almost 15% relative to its 2000 level.

Transports 
The settlement is served by the Kuummiit Heliport .

References

External links
 eastgreenland.com Settlement map and other information.

Populated places in Greenland
Populated places established in 1915